Dicktown is an American adult animated sitcom created and written by John Hodgman and David Rees for FXX. Hodgman and Rees also star, and serve as executive producers alongside Matt Thompson. The show has been described as a mix of "a little Encyclopedia Brown, a little Scooby-Doo, and a lot of heart."

The first season premiered on July 9, 2020, as a weekly segment on the third season of Cake. The second season began airing as a standalone series on March 3, 2022.

Premise
The series is set in the fictional North Carolina town of Richardsville (nicknamed "Dicktown"), where John Hunchman (voiced by Hodgman) solves mysteries for local teenagers, assisted by his former bully David Purefoy (Rees).

Richardsville is based on Rees' hometown of Chapel Hill. The Lunch Hut diner in the show is based on Sutton's Drug Store, a character is named for Culbreth Middle School, and another is named for Purefoy Road where Rees attended pre-school.

Cast

Main
 John Hodgman as John Hunchman
 David Rees as David Purefoy

Recurring
 Ronald Peet as Tucker
 Stephen Tobolowsky as John’s Dad
 Jon Glaser as Mark Tagliano
 Obehi Janice as Heather Culbreath
 Amy Sedaris as Giovanna
 Heather Lawless as Jen the Waitress
 Anna Akana as Meg
 Griffin Newman as Lance
 Kristen Schaal as Kendra
 Paul F. Tompkins as Loafer Toeknuckle
 Janie Haddad Tompkins as Emma Bowers
 Jean Grae as Monica

Guest
 Zach Galifianakis as Charlie
 Amber Nash as Marinello
 Janet Varney as Tracey
 Lovie Simone
 Lauren Ashley Smith as Croquet Player
 Sarah Vowell
 Mike Mitchell
 Jo Firestone
 Aimee Mann

Production
Animation for the series is provided by Floyd County Productions.

Release
Dicktown premiered on July 9, 2020, as part of FXX's anthology series Cake, with ten segments airing throughout its third season; these segments were also released as standalone episodes for streaming on Hulu, categorized as season 1.

The second season of Dicktown – its first as a standalone series on linear television – premiered on March 3, 2022, on FXX in the United States and Canada, with two segments airing in a 30-minute block each week for five weeks.

Episodes

Series overview

Season 1 (2020)
The first season aired as a segment on Cake.

Season 2 (2022)

Reception

Critical reception 
Joel Keller of Decider wrote, "Dicktown is not only funny, it tells a pretty good story of two guys who should have grown up a long time ago but for one reason or another they just haven’t. But, bless them, they keep trying." Steve Greene of IndieWire asserted, "Amid the bevy of recurring animated series that make up some of the most memorable Cake filling, Dicktown may well be the richest. John Hodgman and David Rees’ sharp spin on a boy detective all grown up and living in his North Carolina hometown is effortlessly entertaining."

References

External links 
 

2020s American adult animated television series
2020s American sitcoms
2020 American television series debuts
American adult animated comedy television series
American animated sitcoms
English-language television shows
FXX original programming
Television series by Fox Television Animation
Television shows scored by JG Thirlwell
Television shows set in North Carolina
Works by John Hodgman
Works by David Rees (cartoonist)